Hans Bollandsås also known as just Hans (born in Melhus, Sør-Trøndelag, Norway on October 28, 1980) is a Norwegian blues musician who won the Norwegian X Factor in 2010.

In a final that was held on 11 December 2010, by beating Atle Pettersen and Annsofi Pettersen, to the top. He was mentored by judge Elisabeth Andreassen in the over 25 category. Earlier in 2010, he had won the Notodden national competition in blues guitar. He is married and has two children.

Discography

Albums

Collaborations
2010: X Factor 2010 (with various artists competing on X Factor)

Singles

References

External links
MySpace site

1980 births
Living people
English-language singers from Norway
The X Factor winners
21st-century Norwegian singers
21st-century Norwegian male singers
Musicians from Melhus